The 1900 Marshall Thundering Herd football team represented Marshall University in the 1900 college football season. The team did not have a coach, and outscored their opponents 20–0 in three games.

The 1900 season marked the second undefeated season in a row for Marshall.

Schedule

References

Marshall
Marshall Thundering Herd football seasons
College football undefeated seasons
Marshall Thundering Herd football